Kakinada (formerly called Kakinandiwada, Coringa, and Cocanada) is the sixth largest city of the Indian state of Andhra Pradesh and serves as the district headquarters of the Kakinada District. It lies on the coast of the Bay of Bengal. J.N.T.U. College of Engineering Kakinada, established in 1946, is the oldest and popular Government college in the state of Andhra Pradesh. The First Polytechnic college of Andhra Pradesh, Andhra Polytechnic was established here in 1946. It was also the origin point of Buckingham Canal where goods used to be transported by boats during the British rule. It was once home for Asia's largest sea port (now near the village Coringa). Many people from the city migrated from this sea port to countries like Burma, Mauritius, Fiji and various southeast Asian countries to work there as workers where they were called as Coringas.

Kakinada is also one of the fastest growing city in Andhra Pradesh. Kakinada is known for its sweet called kaja which became a famous recipe in South India known as Kakinada Kaja. Apart from this, it is also known for food. The city is popular for "Subbayya Gari Hotel" known across the country for its authentic Vegetarian meals. The city is also home to a snack called Bajji which is famous throughout the state. Along with these it is mostly known for its town planning, one of the most greatly well planned towns in the entire country. The Indian Standard Time (IST) exactly passes through this city in the southern part of India. Hope Island, which lies just off the city's coast, naturally acts as a barrier and protects the city from cyclones and tsunami effects which also serves as a tourist spot.

It used to have more than 15 cinema theatres along a road (for which it has a dedicated road named after that as Cinema Road) and is known as Second Madras (because Madras [now Chennai], used to have many cinema theatres along a road). It also has a dedicated road for temples known as Temple street which justifies its status as the best-planned city. It is also known for its pleasant climate and recreating atmosphere for which, it is also known as Pensioner's Paradise indicating as a place to settle for mental peace and health. It is also a gateway for a region called Konaseema which is regarded as Second Kerala which is very famous for its scenic Coconut Trees and picturesque green farm fields surrounded by River Gouthami just like Kerala. It also has the second largest Mangrove forests in India near a village named Coringa which serves as a great tourist spot in Coringa Wildlife Sanctuary. It also has one of the oldest and biggest Government Hospitals of the state known as Government General Hospital, Kakinada.

Due to the love for Cinema and arts it had for years, the city is also home for many Telugu Cinema (Tollywood) Film Celebrities namely Suryakantham, Rao Gopal Rao, Relangi, P.B.Srinivas, C.S.Rao, Chitti Babu, P.Adinarayana Rao, Chaganti Koteswara Rao, Krishna Bhagawan, Goutham Raju, Ohmkar, Anchor Shyamala, Singer Anjana Sowmya, Pavala Syamala.

Culturally, the city has a popular dialect known as Godavari Dialect which is one of the most famous dialects of Andhra Pradesh. Politically, it is also a very important seat of power as there is a sentiment of forming the Government in Andhra Pradesh if won in this region. It is also close to many famous holy temples of the district.

It is one of the three smart cities of Andhra Pradesh under Smart Cities Mission. A second new port is being constructed by GMR Group which will become the biggest port in the state. A Petroleum Complex is constructed by the Indian government as the region is full of gas and petroleum resources. It is one of the most rapidly developing cities of the India.

Etymology 
Kaki Nandiwada, presently Kakinada claimed to be second Madras (presently called as Chennai) was a Dutch settlement. They used to store and export Saree (known as Coca or Koka in Telugu) products and hence the name Coca-nada. There was also a theory when British East India Company ruled this city, they had difficulty pronouncing the city's name Coca-nada, so they changed it as Co-Canada for their convenience.  It is even referred to as Coringa by the British because of the proximity of its sea port to the river Koringa.

The British East India Company also called it Cocanada when they established the first Canadian Baptist Mission. After Independence, it finally got the name Kakinada. Some theories suggest Kakasura's losing his eye by an arrow of Lord Rama gave the name Kakinada or that Kaki Nandivada is derived from (Kaka, an Ikshvaku king) who built the town. Another theory says that it is Kakulavada, an abode of crows – for catching fish on the shore.

History 

During the colonization of the Dutch Coromandel coast, the Dutch East India Company maintained a trading post known as Jaggernaikpoeram or Jaggernaickpuram (among other spellings) to the English. On 25 September 1734 Haji Muhammad Hussain, then Nawab of Rajamundry, issued a parwana and a kaul to the Dutch by which the hamlet of " Jagernaykpalam" was given in full possession to the VOC for erecting a loge there.

The British established the site in 1759 as a shipbuilding and ship repair facility. The British knew the area as the Coromandel coast, and Coringa Town (now called Kakinada) on the Coringa River, a branch of the Godavari river. As the principal seaport on this coast, it soon became a large shipbuilding yard of some importance. In 1802 a dock was built for repair of Royal Navy and other vessels, it boasted the only wet dock between Bombay and Calcutta. Cape Cori, or Hope Island as it was called was known internationally for shipbuilding and repairs. The facilities were destroyed by massive cyclonic storms and tidal waves in 1787 (causing 20,000 fatalities) and again on 9 and 10 May 1832. On 25 November 1839 yet another even greater cyclone finished off the port and it was not to recover. It has been estimated that the storm surge was as much as 40 feet. The harbour city was destroyed as were some 20,000 vessels of various sizes. This was one of the storms cited by Henry Piddington in a speech to the ‘'Asiatic Society of Bengal'’ where he first used the term ‘'cyclone'’ to describe the phenomena. After the 1839 cyclone, homes were relocated further inland.

In 1901 due to sand depositing, and silting of the estuary not a single ship of any consequence could enter the port, by 1905 the construction of ships had ceased, and the port was closed.

In the Madras Presidency, the District of Rajahmundry was created in 1823. It was reorganised in 1859 and was bifurcated into Godavari and Krishna districts. During British rule, Rajahmundry was the headquarters of Godavari district, which was further bifurcated into East Godavari and West Godavari districts in 1925. When the Godavari district was divided, Kakinada became the headquarters of East Godavari and Eluru became headquarters of West Godavari. On 4 April 2022, East Godavari district further bifurcated into 3 and one of the New district was formed in the name of Kakinada, with Kakinada as headquarters

Geography 

The 82-degrees east longitude passes through the city. It has an average elevation of 2 metres (6 ft), and many areas of the city are below sea level.

The city consists of two regions, connected by bridges. The southern part, Jagannadhapuram, is separated from the rest of the city by the Buckingham Canal. The canal and its branches form Medaline Island, which abuts the city in the southwest.

An industrial belt and rich, running north–south the length of the city, separates the eastern part from the coast. Kakinada is bordered on the southeast by Kakinada Bay and a marshy wetland, home to India's second-largest mangrove forest and the Coringa Wildlife Sanctuary. A branch of the Godavari River, the Gouthami, flows into the Bay of Bengal at this point.

Climate 

Kakinada has a tropical savanna climate (Köppen climate classification: Aw/As) with hot, humid weather most of the year. The warmest time of the year is late May and early June, with maximum temperatures around 38–42 °C (100–108 °F). January is the coolest month, with minimum temperatures of 18–20 °C (64–68 °F). The city gets most of its seasonal rainfall from the southwest monsoon, although considerable rain also falls during the northeast monsoon (from mid-October to mid-December). Cyclones in the Bay of Bengal frequently strike the city. Kakinada's prevailing winds are from the southwest for most of the year, except from October to January when they are from the northeast.

Demographics 

As of 2011 census of India, Kakinada had population of 443,028 of which 222,461 were male and 220,567 female and the outgrowths. The Kakinada urban agglomeration had a population of 443,028 of which males are 217,459 while female population are 225,569 and the outgrowths. There are 101 identified slums in the city, which contains a population of 132,185, 41% of the city's population. It is the 115th biggest city in India and one of the fastest-growing cities in Andhra Pradesh.

Governance 

The urban agglomeration constituents include the areas of Kakinada Municipal Corporation, census towns of Chidiga, Ramanayyapeta, Suryaraopeta and the out growths of Ganganapalle, Sarpavaram, Vakalapudi and Turangi.

Economy 
The economy of the city depends mainly on agriculture, fishing and industrial sectors. paddy, coconut are agro products from the city. The majority of the industrial sector is covered edible oil refineries, fertilizers and natural gas. During the late 1940s (around the time of Indian independence) there was little industry in or around Kakinada; the local economy was based on agriculture and fishing. Until the early 1980s (before the fertilizer companies began operation), the local economy revolved around the textile industry, auto parts, steel-related ancillary units, agriculture and fishing.

Kakinada port 
It is home to two ports namely, an Anchorage port and a Deep-water port ( and also third port is going to be constructed in KSEZ which will be Greenfield Seaport ). Kakinada's deep-water port is the second-largest in the state (after Visakhapatnam port) and the first in the country to be built in a public-private partnership, in 1996 It is operated by Kakinada Seaports. Before the deep-water port was built, the Anchorage port was the largest of India's 40 minor ports.

Kakinada's principal exports include seafood (Prawns, Shrimp, Fish) and related products, agricultural products (including rice and corn), oilmeals, processed food products, chemicals, iron ore, bauxite powder and biofuel. Imports include chemicals, edible oils and agricultural products (including wheat and sugar).

Industrial sector 
A number of industries and edible oil refineries, and serves as a base for a thriving oil and gas industry for the state of Andhra Pradesh are established at Kakinada.

Agro−products 
Coconuts are exported by several companies in and around Kakinada. The Murugappa Group-owned EID Parry (India) and Cargill International joint venture, Silk Road Sugars, has a port-based stand-alone sugar refinery in Kakinada with a capacity of 600,000 tonnes.,

Edible oil refineries and biofuel plants 
In 2002, several edible-oil refineries were established in Kakinada, with a refining capacity of 3,000 tons per day; they include Acalmar Oils and Fats (taken over by Adani Wilmar), Ruchi Infrastructure and Nikhil Refineries. The port facilitates the importation of crude palm and soybean oil.

Vakalapudi Industrial Park has attracted over $10 million in investment from biodiesel companies such as Reliance Industries, Natural Bioenergy and Universal Bio Fuel. Andhra Pradesh has entered into an agreement with Reliance Industries for jatropha planting. The company selected  of land in Kakinada to grow jatropha for quality biodiesel fuel.

Information technology 

Kakinada is a tier-II city. Software Technology Parks of India (STPI) established a facility here in 2007. Since then, several IT companies have come up in the city, mainly due to its educated workforce available in the city.

Nearly, 35 Software and IT companies are operating from Kakinada. Some of the notable software companies include Cyient, Avineon, Krify, Primesoft etc.

An IT Association by the name "Godavari IT Association of East and West Godavari districts" (GITA) which an association of IT companies in the twin Godavari districts is formed in 2008 which is based in the city. Since 2016, GITA is merged with "IT Association of Andhra Pradesh" (ITAAP) forming a separate chapter called ITAAP Godavari Chapter.

Resources

Power generation 
There are several power plants in and around Kakinada. Spectrum Power Generation has a 208-MW plant and was one of the first Independent Power Producers in the country. The company is planning to expand its capacity to 1350 MW in phases. Tenders for a 350-MW expansion have been requested. A 220-MW power station (being expanded to 2400 MW at a cost of Rs 100 billion) owned by Reliance Energy and a 464-MW combined-cycle power plant by GVK Group are in operation at Samalkota (Kakinada Rural). These plants supply electricity to the state's transmission utility, AP Transco, under a power purchase agreement.

Natural gas and petroleum 
Kakinada is the base for Oil and Natural Gas Corporation's Eastern Offshore Asset. Several oil companies use Kakinada for oil and gasoline shipments. Baker Hughes and Schlumberger are field-development companies working on offshore natural-gas fields near the city. The Krishna Godavari Basin is considered the largest natural gas basin in India. Significant discoveries of oil and natural gas were made by Oil and Natural Gas Corporation (ONGC), Gujarat State Petroleum Corporation and Reliance, which has been extracting gas from its KG D6 block off the Kakinada coast. Reliance Gas Transportation Infrastructure (RGTIL) has built a  pipeline from Kakinada to Bharuch (Gujarat) to transport 120 million cubic meters per day (mcmd) of natural gas from the Krishna-Godavari fields (owned by Reliance Industries) across India to its west coast.

In 2010, the Petroleum and Natural Gas Regulatory Board awarded Kakinada's gas-distribution project to Bhagyanagar Gas, a consortium of GAIL and Hindustan Petroleum. Construction is underway to supply gas to Kakinada and the surrounding towns of Samalkot, Peddapuram and Pithapuram, making Kakinada the second city in Andhra Pradesh to have a piped gas supply for domestic, commercial and industrial purposes.

Culture

Festivals 

Kakinada Beach Festival (also Sagara Sambaralu) is a music festival held in Kakinada. It was declared as an annual festival by the government of Andhra Pradesh in 2012. It is a three-day event where many artists perform.

Notable personalities 

The city has its recognition in Tollywood films with notable actors, actresses and directors namely, Anjali Devi, Suryakantham, Relangi, Rao Gopal Rao, C. Pullaiah, P. B. Srinivas, and Chittajallu Srinivasa Rao

Indian cricketer BCCI with notable players, Cricketer namely, Hanuma Vihari.

Literature 
Kasibhatta Brahmaiah Sastry was a noted Sanskrit and Telugu scholar. Garikipati is mahasahasravadhani and he wrote sagaraghosha epic.{{Citation == Literature ===
Kasibhatta Brahmaiah Sastry was a noted Sanskrit and Telugu scholar. Garikipati is mahasahasravadhani and he wrote sagaraghosha epic.
 Ryali Prasad 
was a noted modern poet short story writer and also history researcher.He writes 32 poetry epics and history books about various locations.He created avadhanam in free verse poetry in telugu.And he is writes "Kakinada Charitra" the complete history of Kakinada. 2021}}

Transport 

The city has various modes of transport in terms of road, rail and sea. Previously private city buses and rickshaws used to dominate the roads but after massive amount of urbanisation the primary mode of intra-city public transport is auto rickshaws and there are about 7,000 of them being operated in the city limits with an additional of 3,000 from the surrounding settlements. Non-transport vehicles cover, Motorcycles, bicycles. For cyclists and motorists, there are planned cycling paths, bicycle sharing stations, and bike hiring outlets.

Roadways 

Kakinada is connected by road to the rest of the state and other cities of India by means of National Highways. National Highway 216 which stretches from Kathipudi to Ongole passes through Kakinada. The bypass road is under construction which reduces the traffic in the city It is a well planned city with Grid type Road network. The city has a total road length of 719.21 km.state highway 42 connects Kakinada with other cities. ADB Road and Canal Road connects Kakinada with Rajamahendravaram. Government is going to construct a new national highway to Tuni along coast under Sagaramala scheme.

Railways 

It is recognised as one of the Adarsh stations of the division in South Coast Railway zone.

SCR operates its carriage and Wagon depot which is one of the medium sized depots in Vijayawada division. It's the second station after Vijayawada Junction railway station to have Intermediate Overhauling IOH shed for all types of coaches.

Waterways 

Kakinada Port is located on the shore of Bay of Bengal. It is one of the intermediate ports in the state. The National Waterway 4 connects Kakinada with Puducherry and was declared in 2008 as National Waterway by the Inland Waterways Authority of India for cargo transport and tourism.

Airways 
The nearest airport is Rajahmundry Airport which is 55 km from the city. Reliance Industries Ltd (RIL) operates an Aerodrome at Gadimoga in the city. Cocanada was a stop by Francesco de Pinedo of the Regia Aeronautica and his mechanic, Ernesto Campanelli, during Pinedo's 1925 Rome- Australia-Tokyo-Rome flight.

Education 

The primary and secondary school education is imparted by the government, aided and private schools of the School Education Department of the state. The medium of instruction followed by different schools are English and Telugu.

Kakinada is an educational hub, meeting the growing educational demands of the state. Several professional colleges in and around the city offer courses in engineering, medicine, information technology and management at the graduate and postgraduate levels. The Jawaharlal Nehru Technological University, Kakinada, previously established as Vizagapatnam college of Engineering on military land offers engineering courses and has a business school.
Ministry of commerce has inaugurated the Indian Institute of Foreign Trade in the city making it only their 3rd campus in the country after Delhi & Kolkata.

Andhra University Postgraduate Centre, established in 1977, is another college in Kakinada. The university is located on a  campus in Thimmapuram, six kilometers from the Kakinada Town Railway Station.

Andhra Polytechnic was established in 1946 by the British India Government on the land donated by MSN Charities Jagannaickpur.

National Institute of Technology, Andhra Pradesh, Tadepalligudem is 80 km from Kakinada City.

Tourism 

Coringa Wildlife Sanctuary, part of the Godavari delta, Hope Island, India, a sandspit formed by the Godavari, Konaseema, scenic Godavari delta islands. It is the second-largest mangrove forest in India after Sundarbans. Uppada beach is primarily considered as Kakinada beach which is having one of longest coastlines in Indian beaches. Kakinada beach is meant for its mild blue waters and cold breeze all the day. The temples of Suryanarayana Swami and Kodandaramalayam are located at G. Mamidada which is 20 km from the city. The Bala Tripura Sundari Devi Temple is a famous temple.

Sports 

Cricket is the most popular game in the city, followed by badminton and athletics. Kakinada is home to a number of local cricket teams participating in district and zone matches, with a stadium used for Ranji Trophy matches. The East Godavari District Sports Authority has a sports complex in the city with an indoor stadium and swimming pool. Indian cricket player Hanuma Vihari hails from Kakinada.

Tennis is taught to students by the KTA (Kakinada Tennis Academy) at the tennis courts of Rangaraya Medical College There is a roller-skating rink in Vivekananda Park.

See also 
 List of cities in Andhra Pradesh by population
 List of municipal corporations in Andhra Pradesh

References

External links 

 ULBs of Andhra Pradesh

 
Smart cities in India
Cities in Andhra Pradesh
Port cities in India
District headquarters of Andhra Pradesh
Cities and towns in Kakinada district
Mandal headquarters in Kakinada district